Paradise Public School was established as subsidiary branch of Paradise Coaching Center in year 2011 in the Club Road of Aurangabad in Bihar state. It has the slogan "School with the Difference". The director of this school is civil engineer Krishna Sharma, After creating milestone in coaching world of Bihar, Paradise Coaching Center decided to start a school.

Headquarters
The school's headquarters is in Club Road, Aurangabad, Bihar

References

Schools in Bihar
Educational institutions established in 2011
2011 establishments in Bihar